Cristofer Andrés Salas Barriga (born May 23, 2000) is a Chilean footballer who currently plays as a forward for Deportes Concepción in the Segunda División Profesional de Chile.

Career
After playing for club Deportes Concepción at the Tercera A, the fourth level of Chilean football, and getting promotion to Segunda División, on 2020 season he joined to Chilean Primera División club Coquimbo Unido. Along with Coquimbo Unido, he played at the 2020 Copa Sudamericana.

On 2021 season, he moved to Deportes Antofagasta on a deal for four years.

References

External links
 

Living people
2000 births
People from Concepción, Chile
Sportspeople from Concepción, Chile
Chilean footballers
Deportes Concepción (Chile) footballers
Coquimbo Unido footballers
C.D. Antofagasta footballers
Chilean Primera División players
Segunda División Profesional de Chile players
Association football forwards
21st-century Chilean people